Abingdon Rowing Club is a rowing club on the River Thames based on Wilsham Road in Abingdon-on-Thames, Oxfordshire.

History
The club was founded in 1958  and has produced multiple British champions.

Honours

British champions

Key
O open, *M men, W women, +coxed, -coxless, x sculls, c composite, L lightweight

Notable rowers
Maggie Lambourn (GB international)
Ian Marriott (senior national champion)

See also
Rowing on the River Thames

References

Sport in Oxfordshire
Abingdon-on-Thames
Rowing clubs of the River Thames
Buildings and structures on the River Thames
Rowing clubs in England
Rowing clubs in Oxfordshire